Intelitek is a privately held technology education company focused on STEM education, Robotics, Programming and technology training for machining, manufacturing, industrial maintenance and more.  Based in Derry, New Hampshire, the company was established in 1982 and in July 2001 adopted the name Intelitek, Inc.  The company has customers in North America, South America, Europe, Asia, the Middle East, and Australia, in the fields of secondary education, colleges and universities, and industrial training centers. Intelitek offers educational solutions for: STEM Education, Engineering, Robotics, Advanced Manufacturing, Automation, Industrial Maintenance, Oil and Gas, Process Control, Agriculture.

One of Intelitek's latest releases is an online learning environment, to learn how to program virtual and real robots within the STEM pathways.

Installations and sponsorships
In 2002, Intelitek provided a $350,000 grant to Gilbert High School, installing a state-of-the-art robotics lab in the school's former wood shop.  This was the first such high school robotics lab in the state of Arizona.

In 2007, the Deputy Prime Minister of Russia, Sergei Ivanov, visited the Ufa State Aviation Technical University to tour an educational "Technopark" stocked with sophisticated equipment. One of the key features of the facility was a mini-CNC lathe purchased from Intelitek.  The Technopark was Russia's only facility to have this level of equipment.

Intelitek was a supporting sponsor of the 2011 VEX Robotics Competition World Championship.  And the company's executives also serve as mentors to students in a high school's "Project Lead The Way" program in the headquarters' area.

References

Companies based in New Hampshire
Companies established in 1982
Educational robots
Robotics companies of the United States
1982 establishments in New Hampshire